Namulauulu Vavae Tuilagi (born 1948) is a Samoan politician and former member of the Legislative Assembly of Samoa. He served as Deputy Speaker of the Legislative Assembly in the early 1990s.

References

Living people
Members of the Legislative Assembly of Samoa
Human Rights Protection Party politicians
1948 births
Place of birth missing (living people)
Date of birth missing (living people)